Nymphula fuscomarginalis is a moth in the family Crambidae. It was described by Otto Vasilievich Bremer and William Grey in 1852. It is found in China.

References

Acentropinae
Moths described in 1853